Alfred Harold "Harry" Black (born 6 April 1947) is a former Australian politician. Born in Brisbane, he was a small business operator before entering politics. In 1998, he was elected to the Legislative Assembly of Queensland as the member for Whitsunday, representing Pauline Hanson's One Nation. He remained in the party until December 1999, when the remaining state MPs formed the City Country Alliance under Bill Feldman's leadership. Black was the Alliance's spokesman for Employment, Training and Industrial Relations, Mines and Energy, Tourism, Sport and Racing. He was defeated in 2001 by Labor's Jan Jarratt.

References

1947 births
Living people
One Nation members of the Parliament of Queensland
Politicians from Brisbane
Members of the Queensland Legislative Assembly
21st-century Australian politicians